A Wonderful Night in Split is a 2004 Croatian drama film directed by Arsen Anton Ostojić and starring Dino Dvornik, Marija Škaričić, Coolio, and Mladen Vulić.

Synopsis 
The film is set over the course of a New Year's Eve night in the Croatian port city of Split, where it follows three parallel plots. The first plot line features a small-time drug dealer Nike (Mladen Vulić) and a young widow Marija (Nives Ivanković); the second plot line deals with a drug addict called Maja (Marija Škaričić) who decides to have sex with a US Navy sailor called Franky (Coolio) in exchange for some heroin; the third one shows a young couple, Luka and Anđela (Vicko Bilandžić and Ivana Roščić) who spend the night desperately looking for a place to celebrate the New Year by having their first sexual experience. The plots are connected through a drug dealer Crni (Marinko Prga), through Dino Dvornik's concert, where all of them pass through at some point, and through the omnipresent fireworks that dot the night sky over the course of the film.

Cast

 Mladen Vulić as Nike, drug dealer
 Nives Ivanković as Marija, young widow
 Marija Škaričić as Maja, drug addict
 Coolio as Franky, US Navy sailor stationed in Split
  as Luka, a young man
 Ivana Roščić as Anđela, a young woman
 Dino Dvornik as himself
 Marinko Prga as Crni, drug dealer

Production
Ostojić had considered a role for Dino Dvornik ever since he started writing the screenplay, seeing him as a person who best embodies the spirit of the city of Split. Dvornik readily accepted the offer, taking keen interest in the story, and even gave several suggestions that made it into the film.

Since the film was designed as a visual commentary of social problems that Split is well known for in Croatia, depicted here as always involving drugs and awkward relationships, the whole film was shot in black-and-white photography. The resulting effect is an atmosphere of anxiety and depression, set to contrast the colorful mood of open-air New Year celebrations in Split's main square.

Reception
The film won the Golden Arena awards for Best Cinematography (Marko Pivčević) and Best Film Editing (Dubravko Slunjski) at the 2004 Pula Film Festival, as well as the Birch award for best directing debut and the Oktavijan critics' choice award.

The film's cinematographer, Mirko Pivčević, was nominated for the Golden Frog award at the Camerimage festival, the most renowned European festival dedicated to cinematography, and the film was also shown at the Sarajevo Film Festival as part of their regional program, where it won the Special Jury Prize, and Heart of Sarajevo for Best Actress (Marija Škaričić). It has also earned the director, Arsen Ostojić, a nomination for the European Discovery of the Year at the European Film Awards, as well as the Best Feature Film award at the 2006 RiverRun International Film Festival.

References

 https://web.archive.org/web/20140714150340/http://arhiv.slobodnadalmacija.hr/20060126/kultura01.asp

External links 
 
 

2004 films
2004 drama films
2000s Croatian-language films
English-language Croatian films
2000s English-language films
Croatian black-and-white films
Croatian drama films
2004 directorial debut films
2004 multilingual films
Croatian multilingual films